Davidian may refer to:

Shepherd's Rod, a Seventh-day Adventist offshoot that later called themselves Davidians
Branch Davidian, the most famous Shepherd's Rod splinter group
Davidian (song) by Machine Head from their album Burn My Eyes, also widely covered by other metal bands
Davidian Revolution, changes in Scotland during King David I
Davidian (surname), from an Armenian background
A follower of the distinct form of Wotanism promulgated by David Lane (white supremacist)

See also 

Dravidian (disambiguation)
David (disambiguation)